BNS Meghna is a Meghna-class patrol vessel of the Bangladesh Navy that joined in 1985.

Career
BNS Meghna is serving under the command of the Commodore Commanding BN Flotilla (COMBAN).

On 10 September 2018, a fishing trawler named Swadhin-3 sunk near the Mongla port following a collision with a commercial vessel. 12 fishermen were on board the fishing trawler. BNS Turag responded quickly to rescue 9 fishermen alive. Later, BNS Meghna joined the operation along with BNS Nishan to rescue the other three fishermen.

Armament
Besides that, there are two 7.62mm machine guns as secondary weapons.

See also
BNS Jamuna
List of active ships of the Bangladesh Navy

References

1984 ships
Ships built in Singapore
Patrol vessels of the Bangladesh Navy